The women's field hockey tournament at the 1992 Summer Olympics was the 4th edition of the field hockey event for women at the Summer Olympic Games. It was held over a twelve-day period beginning on 27 July, and culminating with the medal finals on 7 August. All games were played at the Estadi Olímpic de Terrassa in Terrassa, Spain, located 30 kilometers from Barcelona.

Spain won the gold medal for the first time after defeating Germany 2–1 in the final with a golden goal. Great Britain won the bronze medal by defeating South Korea 4–3.

Qualification

Squads

Results

Preliminary round

Group A

Group B

Fifth to eighth place classification

Crossover

Seventh and eighth place

Fifth and sixth place

First to fourth place classification

Semi-finals

Bronze medal match

Gold medal match

Final standings

References

External links

Women's Tournament
1992
1992 Summer Olympics
1992 in women's field hockey
Field